The minister of middle class prosperity was a member of the Canadian Cabinet who was responsible for various files within the Department of Finance Canada as assigned by the minister of finance. 

Mona Fortier was the first and only minister, serving from November 20, 2019 to October 26, 2021. She was concurrently the associate minister of finance. 

This portfolio was introduced under Prime Minister Justin Trudeau following the 2019 election and fell into disuse following the 2021 election.

Criticism of role 
The creation of the cabinet post was widely criticized and mocked due to not appearing to have a clear mandate, and the minister failing to define what the middle class was when challenged.

List of ministers

References 

Middle Class
Department of Finance (Canada)